Sauro Bufalini (28 April 1941 – 1 April 2012) was an Italian professional basketball player and coach. He was inducted into the Italian Basketball Hall of Fame, in 2011.

Career
Bufalini was a member of the FIBA European Selection team, in 1965. Bufalini was also a member of the senior Italian national basketball team. He competed at the 1964 Summer Olympic Games, and at the 1968 Summer Olympic Games, and finished in fifth and eighth place, respectively.

References

External links

 
FIBA Profile
FIBA Europe Profile
Italian League Profile 

1941 births
2012 deaths
Italian men's basketball players
1967 FIBA World Championship players
Italian basketball coaches
Olympic basketball players of Italy
Basketball players at the 1964 Summer Olympics
Basketball players at the 1968 Summer Olympics
Partenope Napoli Basket players
Pallacanestro Varese players
Sportspeople from Pisa
Reyer Venezia players
Centers (basketball)
Libertas Liburnia Basket Livorno players